Peter Carruthers may refer to:
 Peter Carruthers (philosopher) (born 1952), professor of philosophy
 Peter A. Carruthers (1935–1997), physicist
 Peter Carruthers (figure skater) (born 1959), Olympic figure skater